João Francisco Inácio Brazão (born 22 February 1962, Rio de Janeiro) widely known as Chiquinho Brazão , is a Brazilian businessman  and politician  of the União Brasil.

He was elected to the Brazilian Chamber of Deputies in the 2018 elections for Avante with a total vote of 25,817. Brazão is brother to Domingos Brazão and Pedro Brazão  well known politicians.

References 

  
Living people
1962 births
Brazilian politicians